778 is the year 778 AD.

778 may also refer to:

778 (number)
Area code 778, an area code in British Columbia, Canada
778 Theobalda, a minor planet orbiting the Sun in the main asteroid belt
777-8